Mutal (Motal) is a rural locality (a village) in Shabagishsky Selsoviet, Kuyurgazinsky District, Bashkortostan, Russia. The population was 4 as of 2010. There is one street.

Geography 
Mutal is located 22 km northwest of Yermolayevo (the district's administrative centre) by road. Kholodny Klyuch is the nearest rural locality.

References 

Rural localities in Kuyurgazinsky District